In metadata, a synonym ring or synset, is a group of data elements that are considered semantically equivalent for the purposes of information retrieval.  These data elements are frequently found in different metadata registries. Although a group of terms can be considered equivalent, metadata registries store the synonyms at a central location called the preferred data element.

According to WordNet, a synset or synonym set is defined as a set of one or more synonyms that are interchangeable in some context without changing the truth value of the proposition in which they are embedded.

Example 

The following are considered semantically equivalent and form a synonym ring:

 foaf:person
 gjxdm:Person
 niem:Person
 sumo:Human
 cyc:Person
 umbel:Person

Note that each data element has two components:

 Namespace prefix, which is a shorthand for the name of the metadata registry
 Data element name, which is the name of the object in each of the distinct metadata registry

Expressing a synonym ring 
A synonym ring can be expressed by a series of statements in the Web Ontology Language (OWL) using  the classEquivalence or the propertyEquivalence or instance equivalence statement – the sameAs property.

See also
Data Reference Model
Metadata
Vocabulary-based transformation
WordNet

External links
 WordNet at Princeton

Metadata